The Irish Albums Chart is a record chart compiled by Chart-Track on behalf of the Irish Recorded Music Association. The chart week runs from Friday to Thursday.

See also
 List of number-one singles of 2012 (Ireland)

References

Number-one albums
Ireland
2012